Heimweg  (English: "The Way Home")  is a novel from the German author and journalist Harald Martenstein.  It was released in February 2007.  In Germany, it is currently the most popular representation of post-war fiction.

Plot
The focus of the story is on the first-person narrator, a grandfather named Josef.  He returns home from Russian captivity after the war to find his wife Katharina in an adulterous relationship.  Over the course of the story, he tries to get her back.  In this respect, he is successful, seeing that she is becoming insane and in this connection only turns to him.  The family history continues over several generations,  revealing several torn characters and many murders, including his son's murder and suicide.  In a key scene, it is revealed that Josef ordered the execution of a Russian commissar during World War II.  This is executed helplessly and without judgment by the Commissar Order.  After that, Josef needlessly kills another corpse of crouching boys.

Towards the end of the story, the mental confusion of Katharina is explained.  The "visitors" that she believes to be in her apartment, are in fact the family members of the dead.  They appear again in the book on a fictional level as a quasi-ghost figure, while at the same time the heroes appear to be real.  The reader learns this as the real family members begin to die.  Finally, the first-person narrator finally turns out to be the spirits of the murdered boys.

German-language novels